Carlos Eduardo de Castro Lourenço (born 31 May 1987), commonly known as Rincón, is a Brazilian footballer who is currently unemployed after most recently playing for KSV Roeselare in the Belgian First Division B as a defender.

Football career

Early career
From an early age, Rincón was tipped to be the natural successor to Brazilian and Milan defender Cafu. The young right back became known for his attacking flair and soon signed a pre-contract with Manchester United, where he was expected to progress at a quick rate. Rincón stayed in São Paulo and signed a three-year contract in June 2003. New FIFA rules, which came into effect in January 2004, prevented international transfers of players under-18, thus he was unable to obtain a work permit. Rincón never joined Manchester United and later left for Internazionale (via Empoli).

Italy
In the summer of 2006, Rincon moved to Italian Serie A side Empoli, like Maxwell, Rincon officially became Internazionale player at the mid of season as Empoli borrow the non-EU registration quota.

Rincón remained on loan for the rest of the 2006–07 season. He played two matches for Empoli in the Coppa Italia. In the 2007–08 season, he played in two UEFA Cup matches.

In summer 2008, he left for A.C. Ancona on loan, followed the next year by a loan move to Piacenza.

On the last day of the 2010 transfer window, Rincon joined Chievo in a co-ownership deal with Inter, but after only 6 months, he was loaned out to Serie B side, Grosseto.

France
On 18 August 2011, he signed a two-year contract with French Ligue 2 outfit Troyes AC.

References

External links
Profile at La Gazzetta
CBF Archive

Living people
1987 births
Footballers from São Paulo
Association football fullbacks
Brazilian footballers
Brazilian expatriate footballers
Inter Milan players
Empoli F.C. players
A.C. Ancona players
Piacenza Calcio 1919 players
A.C. ChievoVerona players
F.C. Grosseto S.S.D. players
ES Troyes AC players
Stade Lavallois players
K.S.V. Roeselare players
Serie B players
Ligue 1 players
Ligue 2 players
Championnat National players
Championnat National 2 players
Championnat National 3 players
Challenger Pro League players
Brazilian expatriate sportspeople in Italy
Brazilian expatriate sportspeople in France
Brazilian expatriate sportspeople in Belgium
Expatriate footballers in Italy
Expatriate footballers in France
Expatriate footballers in Belgium